Gilberto Vieira White (5 April 1911, Medellín - 25 February 2000) was a Colombian politician. He was a founder of the Colombian Communist Party, and served as the General Secretary of the party between 1947 and 1991. He was also a parliamentarian for a period.

Personal life
Gilberto Vieira was born on 5 April 1911 in Medellín, Antioquia, the only son of Joaquín Vieira Gaviria and Mercedes White Uribe

References

1911 births
2000 deaths
People from Medellín
Colombian people of Galician descent
Colombian people of English descent
Colombian Communist Party politicians
Members of the Chamber of Representatives of Colombia
Recipients of the Order of Friendship of Peoples